Varilhes (Languedocien: Varilhas) is a commune in the Ariège department in southwestern France. Varilhes station has rail connections to Toulouse, Foix and Latour-de-Carol.

Population
Inhabitants of Varilhes are called Varilhois in French.

See also
Communes of the Ariège department

References

Communes of Ariège (department)
Ariège communes articles needing translation from French Wikipedia